Velana International Airport (VIA)  is the main international airport in the Maldives. It is located on Hulhulé Island in the North Malé Atoll, nearby the capital island Malé. The airport is well connected with major airports around the world, mostly serving as the main gateway into the Maldives for tourists. It is managed financially and administratively by a state owned company known as Maldives Airports Company Limited (MACL).

History

Hulhulé Airport
The airport first started out as a small strip of land on the then inhabited island of Hulhulé. Hulhulé Airport was opened on 19 October 1960. The first runway built on Hulhulé Island was made of slotted steel sheets. The first aircraft which landed at the airport was a Royal New Zealand Air Force Bristol Freighter, NZ5906, on 19 October 1960 at 13:55hrs. The first commercial flight was an Air Ceylon flight (Avro 748; 4R-ACJ) landed on this runway was at 15:50hrs on 10 April 1962. The first aircraft owned by the Maldives landed on the runway of the Hulhulé Airport on 9 October 1974.

In May 1964, the government and the people of Malé worked together to construct a new asphalt runway. The four districts of Malé competed for the prize money of 1,000 rufiyaa, awarded to the fastest district. On the first day 108 volunteers were enlisted for the project and 1,563.08 rufiyaa was donated. The new runway was opened on 12 April 1966 at 16:00 by President Ibrahim Nasir.

Upgrade to Velana International Airport
When the tourism boom in the Maldives began in 1972, the country was in need of an international standard airport to transport international tourists to the resort islands. So, on 11 November 1981, the airport was officially inaugurated under a new name of "Malé International Airport".

Maldives Airports Company Ltd (MACL) was formed on 1 January 1994 to operate and manage the Malé International Airport. MACL is governed by the board of directors appointed by the President of the Maldives.

On 26 July 2011, Malé International Airport was officially renamed as the Ibrahim Nasir International Airport in memory of Ibrahim Nasir, the 2nd President of the Maldives and the founder of the airport.

On 1 January 2017, the airport was rebranded as Velana International Airport, referring to the family house name of President Ibrahim Nasir. The rebranding is part of a strategic plan in aligning the airport with the economic vision of the Yameen administration.

Privatisation of the airport
In 2010, the Nasheed administration appointed IFC to run a bidding process for the privatisation of the airport. The bid was won by a consortium between GMR Group and Malaysia Airports who provided Rufiyaa 1 billion as upfront fee to the government for the expansion and modernisation of the airport by 2014, and its operation for 25 years.

By the end of the year, MACL officially handed over the aerodrome licence of the airport to the newly formed GMR Malé International Airport Ltd (GMIAL). GMIAL announced that the development plans included reclaiming more land at the eastern end of the runway; where a new terminal is to be built. This terminal would consist of three separate bridged buildings. Plans for a separate cargo terminal were also announced. However, the project faced numerous delays.

In late 2012, the new government of Maldives under the Waheed administration declared that the concession agreement was void ab initio and on 27 November 2012 gave GMIAL a deadline of seven days to 'evict the airport', a decision which drew mass protests from the government's opposition, as well as criticism from the government and media of India. On 7 December, GMR handed over the airport to the government, and MACL was reinstated as the operator.

Expansion of the airport 

On 18 September 2018, the airport finished a new runway. It is 3,400 metres long and 60 metres wide, built to serve larger aircraft.  However, it was only used as a taxiway until 2022 when the old Trans Maldivian Airways seaplane terminal was finally demolished as it was in closer proximity than required by International aviation standards. Although the new runway was inaugurated on 5 September 2018 by then president of Maldives, Yameen Abdul Gayoom, it was not in use for scheduled flights for 4 years from then until the runway was fully ready.

On 26 June 2019, a Maldivian Airbus A320 successfully tested the new southwest apron at Velana International Airport. This was the first live flight operation testing by Maldives Airports Company as they awaited final certification for operations.  On 17 July 2019, the new apron was opened for flight operations. The ICAO fully compliant apron has three Code E MARS stands, two dedicated Code E stands and one dedicated Code C stand.

On 6 October 2022, a new Seaplane Terminal was opened. The terminal was developed by China’s Beijing Urban Construction Group (BUCG) at a cost of US$55 million. In the world’s largest seaplane operation, the new terminal and dock can accommodate more than 100 seaplanes and operate 300 daily flights on average rising to 600 during peak season with the capacity to serve more than 6,000 tourists a day. With 28,000 square meters of floor space, the four-storey terminal building includes offices, arrival lobbies, and 42 lounges, most of which are dedicated for resorts aside from the MACL’s VIP and business lounges.

The foundation work of the new passenger terminal being constructed at the airport has been completed as of December 2019. The new passenger terminal is being developed at the south of the current international terminal and will have an area of over 78,000 square metres. The current terminal was designed to serve 1 million passengers per year while the new terminal will have the capacity to serve 7.3 million passengers per year. Expected completion time of the new terminal is by 2025 and will cost about US$357 million. The project was contracted to Saudi Bin Laden Group in 2019. The expansion project also includes the construction of a cargo terminal and a fuel farm that is expected to be completed in 2020. The current cargo terminal permits the handling of 50,000 tonnes of cargo per year, the new terminal is expected to process 120,000 tonnes of cargo per year. The new fuel farm area is three times larger than the current fuel farm, while the current fuel storage capacity of the entire airport is 15,000 metric tonnes, the fuel storage capacity at the airport would reach 45,000 metric tonne by the end of the project. Under this project, an 8.4 kilometer 'Fuel Hydrant' has been installed under the airport to fuel aircraft. After the system is implemented, fuel trucks will no longer be needed to fuel aircraft, improving safety and shortening service time for the airlines.

The New Runway became operational by 6 October 2022, with a Boeing 777 operated by Emirates from Dubai, UAE, landing on the new Runway, with the existing runway being converted into a permanent taxiway, as TMA finished moving to the new seaplane terminal by August 2022. The old runway was closed by a departing Turkish Airlines Airbus A330 bound for Istanbul, Turkey.  The runway was developed by China's Beijing Urban Construction Group (BUCG) at a cost of USD 452 million. With the operationalization of the new runway, the waiting time between landing flights will be decreased from 15 minutes to 3 minutes. The previous runway only accommodated 8 flights per hour. Meanwhile, the new runway can accommodate 21 flights per hour.

Facilities
Runway NL is takeoff only and runway SR is landing only due to proximities to flying restricted areas.

The airport has three terminals: the International Terminal, the Domestic Terminal and the waterdrome Seaplane Terminal.

The airport includes the corporate headquarters of Trans Maldivian Airways.

Airlines and destinations

Notes:
: Turkish Airlines's flight from Istanbul to Colombo makes one stop in Malé. However, Turkish Airlines does not have fifth freedom rights to carry passengers solely from Malé to Colombo.

Statistics
As of October 2019, SriLankan Airlines is the largest foreign carrier into the Maldives with over 21 flights a week. Bandaranaike International Airport in Sri Lanka is the most common direct stop out of the Maldives as it is served by SriLankan Airlines, Emirates, Korean Air, China Southern Airlines, China Eastern Airlines, Turkish Airlines, Oman Air and Saudia who operate a combined total of up to 10 flights daily between Sri Lanka and the Maldives.

Incidents and accidents
 On 18 October 1995 an Air Maldives Dornier 228 abruptly turned right, left the runway, struck the seawall and somersaulted into the adjacent lagoon while landing. The plane was written off.
 On 15 August 1996 a Hummingbird Helicopter MIL Mi-8P lost control after takeoff due to a loss of hydraulic pressure. Four people received minor injuries.
 On 17 May 2004 a Trans Maldivian Airways de Havilland Canada DHC-6 Twin Otter Series 300 collided with the sea-wall of runway 18 after experiencing problems taking off from the seaplane base. Both pilots and one passenger were seriously injured in the accident. The aircraft was written off.

See also
List of airports in Maldives

References

External links

 Official website
 Official twitter
 Official facebook
 
 
 

Airports in the Maldives
Airports established in 1960
1960 establishments in the Maldives
Seaplane bases